18 Vayasu Puyale is a 2007 Tamil language romance film directed by M. Vijay. The film stars newcomer Ajay Pradeep and Preethi Varma, with Rajesh, Nalini, Fathima Babu, Thanalakshmi, Babu, Vennira Aadai Moorthy, Lollu Sabha Balaji, Pandu, Srilatha, and Scissor Manohar playing supporting roles. The film was produced by M. S. Tamilarasan and M. Illias. It had musical score by Leo, cinematography by Rajarajan, and editing by P. Sai Suresh. The film was released on 14 September 2007.

Plot

The storyline revolves around Surya (Ajay Pradeep), a college dropout and good-for-nothing guy. Surya is from a middle-class family and lives with his father Ramakrishnan (Rajesh), mother Seetha (Fathima Babu), and little sister Divya (Thanalakshmi). Ramakrishnan advised Surya to be more responsible and find a job as quickly as possible. Surya, with a certificate on hand, decides to look for a job. One day, at a pedestrian crossing, Surya falls in love at first sight with a girl named Pooja (Preethi Varma).

Surya starts hanging out with his friends in his lover's college. Surya tries to impress Pooja by acting like a hero and offering her gifts, but she refuses to accept his love. Pooja tells him that she does not believe in love marriage. Surya, with his parents, arranged a meeting at the groom's house, where he made a marriage proposal to Pooja. Pooja and her family agree to an arranged marriage. Surya and Pooja eventually get married.

All of these events turn out to be Surya's imagination. At the pedestrian crossing, Surya is immersed in his dreams and gets hit by a car, so Gayathri (Preethi Varma) takes the seriously wounded Surya to the nearby hospital, and he is saved by the doctors. Afterwards, Surya starts the quest to find his lover Gayathri. Gayathri lives with her aunt Vasantha (Nalini), a ruthless loan shark who wants all of her wealth, and her psychopath cousin Gaja (Babu), who wants to marry her. After the death of her parents, Gayathri found herself alone and became depressed. She needed the love of a person, so she runs away from her aunt's house. Thereafter, she tries to commit suicide by jumping off a cliff, but Surya, who passed through, saves her. Surya then reveals that he is crazy about her and wants to marry her. First completely disoriented, Gayathri finally accepts his proposal. Mad with rage, Vasantha and Gaja are looking for Gayathri. What transpires next forms the rest of the story.

Cast

Ajay Pradeep as Surya
Preethi Varma as Pooja / Gayathri
Rajesh as Ramakrishnan
Fathima Babu as Seetha
Thanalakshmi as Divya
Babu as Gaja
Nalini as Vasantha
Vennira Aadai Moorthy as Professor Chellappa
Lollu Sabha Balaji as Chinnappadass
Pandu as Inspector Mustafa
Srilatha as Pooja's mother
Scissor Manohar as Doctor
Rajkrishnan
Jayasurya
Tamilarasan
R. Mahendrakumar
Master Ashwin as Pradeep
Laksha as an item number

Production
The film director M. Vijay claimed that, "the screenplay of his movie was set in a novel and different fashion" and added, "This kind of screenplay may strike a note of similarity with Virumaandi where the first half and the second half of the film were two different interpretations of the same incidents". He stated that, "the film will have all the commercial elements like dappan koothu, comedy, etc". Newcomer Leo had scored music for the film. The story of the film is about 18-year-olds who let their imagination run riot. The scenes which happened in Preethi Varma's real life were reflected in this film. However, the thing was that all of these scenes were shot much earlier than her real life elopement episode.

Soundtrack

The film score and the soundtrack were composed by Leo. The soundtrack, released on 23 April 2007, features 5 tracks with lyrics written by Snehan, Balaji, and R. P. Ilayaraaja.

References

2007 films
2000s Tamil-language films
Indian romance films
2007 directorial debut films
2000s romance films